Jean Nguyen is a Vietnamese-American graduate of the United States Military Academy the first woman of Vietnamese descent to do so and among the largest number of women, 107, to graduate to date. She arrived in the United States following the fall of Saigon not knowing a word of English.  She learned English, finishing in the top of her high school class and went on to West Point. Nguyen received her commission as a Second Lieutenant in the U.S. Army at graduation on May 22, 1985 where she went on to ordnance school at the Aberdeen Proving Ground

Nguyen was the guest of President Reagan at the 1985 State of the Union Address where he recognized her as "embodying the values and opportunities of the United States" and calling her an "American hero."

See also 
 Tam Minh Pham a former Vietnamese soldier who immigrate to the United States and was the first of Vietnamese descent to graduate from the US Military Academy.

References 

United States Military Academy alumni
Year of birth missing (living people)
Living people